Princess Leia is a fictional character of Star Wars.

Leia may also refer to:

People
Leia Dongue (born 1991), Mozambican basketball player
Léia Scheinvar (born 1954), Brazilian-Mexican botanist
Léia Silva (born 1985), Brazilian volleyball player
Leia Meow (born 1976), professional wrestling valet
Peter de Leia (died 1198), Welsh bishop
Leia (Degrassi), fictional character from a Canadian TV series
 Leia Rolando, character in the Tales of Xillia video games

Other uses
LEIA Inc, a Silicon Valley startup company developing an interactive holographic display for mobile devices
Leia (fly), a genus of fungus gnats
Eilema leia, a moth of the family Erebidae

See also 
 Leya (disambiguation)
 Lea (disambiguation)
 Lia (disambiguation)
 Laia (disambiguation)
 Lya (disambiguation)